Muhammad ibn Ibrahim ibn Habib ibn Sulayman ibn Samra ibn Jundab al-Fazari (died 796 or 806) was a Muslim  philosopher, mathematician and astronomer. Some sources refer to him as an Arab, other sources state that he was a Persian. Al-Fazārī translated many scientific books into Arabic and Persian. He is credited to have built the first astrolabe in the Islamic world. This translation was possibly the vehicle by means of which the Hindu numerals were transmitted from India to Islam.

See also
Hindu and Buddhist contribution to science in medieval Islam

References

External links
  (PDF version)
 
 Cantor: Geschichte der Mathematik (I, 3rd ed., 698, 1907).

Year of birth missing
Year of death missing
8th-century astronomers
8th-century Iranian mathematicians
Mathematicians from the Abbasid Caliphate
Philosophers from the Abbasid Caliphate
Arab translators
Medieval Iranian astrologers
Persian translators
Year of death uncertain
Astronomers from the Abbasid Caliphate
Astronomers of the medieval Islamic world
8th-century people from the Abbasid Caliphate
8th-century astrologers
8th-century Arabic writers
8th-century Iranian philosophers